Mario Grgić (born 10 September 1991) is an Austrian professional footballer who plays for Kapfenberger SV. He was born in Banja Luka, Bosnia and Herzegovina.

References

External links
Mario Grgić at ÖFB

1991 births
Living people
Sportspeople from Banja Luka
Austrian people of Bosnia and Herzegovina descent
Bosnia and Herzegovina emigrants to Austria
Association football midfielders
Bosnia and Herzegovina footballers
Austrian footballers
Kapfenberger SV players
SV Mattersburg players
Austrian Football Bundesliga players
2. Liga (Austria) players
Austrian Regionalliga players